Cathepsin H is a protein that in humans is encoded by the CTSH gene.

The protein encoded by this gene is a cysteine cathepsin, a lysosomal cysteine protease important in the overall degradation of lysosomal proteins. It is composed of a dimer of disulfide-linked heavy and light chains, both produced from a single protein precursor. The encoded protein, which belongs to the peptidase C1 protein family, can act both as an aminopeptidase and as an endopeptidase. Increased expression of this gene has been correlated with malignant progression of prostate tumors. Two transcript variants encoding different isoforms have been found for this gene.

References

Further reading

External links
 The MEROPS online database for peptidases and their inhibitors: C01.040

Proteases
EC 3.4.22
Cathepsins